The Hardman Islands are an archipelago in the Solomon Sea. 
Politically they belong to Bwanabwana Rural LLG of Samarai-Murua District of Milne Bay Province, in the southeastern region of Papua New Guinea. They are located southeast of the D'Entrecasteaux Islands.
They are part of the Louisiade Archipelago, and are administered under The Laseinie Islands Ward.

The islands are uninhabited.

References

Archipelagoes of Papua New Guinea
Islands of Milne Bay Province
Louisiade Archipelago